Stephen Brookfield (born 1949 in Liverpool, England) is a scholar in adult education who has held positions at the University of British Columbia, Columbia University, Harvard University and the University of Saint Thomas. He is currently Distinguished Scholar at Antioch University, Adjunct Professor at Columbia University, and Emeritus Professor at the University of St. Thomas.

Education 
Brookfield earned his Ph.D. from the University of Leicester in 1980 and wrote a thesis on independent adult learning.

Career 
In his teaching career, Brookfield has worked in England, Canada, Australia, and the United States, teaching in a variety of college settings. He has written nineteen books on adult learning, adult teaching, critical thinking, discussion methods, critical theory as well as critical pedagogy and teaching race. His overall project is to help adults learn to think critically about the dominant ideologies they have internalized and how these can be challenged. Influenced by the Frankfurt School of Critical Theory and American Pragmatism he has written extensively on how to use methods of critical reflection and discussion based teaching to uncover ideologies such as white supremacy and patriarchy. His twentieth book titled ''Becoming a White Anti-Racist: A Practical Guide to Educators, Leaders and Activists (co-authored with Mary Hess) was published by Stylus Publishers in 2021. 

 Awards 
Brookfield has three honorary doctor of letters degrees; from the University System of New Hampshire in 1991, from Concordia University, St. Paul (St. Paul, Minnesota) in 2003, and from Muhlenberg College in 2010. He won the Cyril O. Houle World Award for Literature in Adult Education six times (in 1986, 1989, 1996, 2005, 2011 and 2012), as well as the 1986 Imogene Okes Award for Outstanding Research in Adult Education, all awarded by the American Association for Adult and Continuing Education. At the University of St. Thomas he has won the John Ireland Presidential Award for Outstanding Achievement as a Teacher/Scholar award for as an exemplary scholar-teacher and the university's Diversity Leadership Teaching and Research Award. His work has been translated into several languages including Korean, German, Finnish, Japanese, Danish, Polish, Persian and Chinese. In 2001 he received the Leadership Award from the Association for Continuing Higher Education (ACHE) for "extraordinary contributions to the general field of continuing education on a national and international level", and in 2008 he was awarded the Morris T. Keeton Award for Contributions to Adult and Experiential learning, awarded by the Council for Academic and Experiential Learning. In 2009 he was inducted into the International Adult Education Hall of Fame. He won the 2014 Philip E. Frandson Award for Literature awarded by the University Professional and Continuing Education Association for his book Powerful Techniques for Teaching Adults. 

 Selected bibliography 

 Books 
 
 
 
 
 
 
 
 
 
 
 
 
 
 
 
 
 
 
 
 Brookfield, Stephen Teaching Race: Helping Students Unmask and Challenge Racism''. 2018. 
 https://styluspub.presswarehouse.com/browse/book/9781620368596/Becoming-a-White-Antiracist Becoming a White Antiracist: A Practical Guide for Educators, Leaders and Activists. Stephen Brookfield and Mary Hess. Sterling, VA: Stylus Publishing, 2021.

Chapters in books 
 Disrupting Whiteness: The Productive Disturbance of George Yancy's Work on White Identity & the White Gaze. In, K. Ducey (Ed.). George Yancy: A Critical Reader. Lanham, MD: Rowman & Littlefield (2020) Forthcoming.
 Using a Pedagogy of Narrative Disclosure to Uncover White Supremacy. In, A. Mandell & Elana Michelson (Eds.). Adult Education in the Age of Trump and Brexit.  San Francisco: Jossey-Bass (2020)
 Uncovering White Supremacy" In, G. Yancy (Ed.). [https://www.routledge.com/Educating-for-Critical-Consciousness/Yancy/p/book/9781138363366 Educating for Critical Consciousness]. New York: Routledge (2019)
 Critical Thinking and Its Limitations: Can We Think Our Way Out of White Supremacy?" In, E. Minnich and M. Patton (Eds.). [https://rowman.com/ISBN/9781538131534/Thought-Work-Thinking-Action-and-the-Fate-of-the-World Thought Work: Learning to Think for Love of the World]. Lanham, MD: Rowman and Littlefield (2020).
 Transformative Learning and the Awareness of White Supremacy." Phronesis, Vol. 7, No. 3 2019. 
 Repressive Tolerance and the 'Management' of Diversity" In, V. Wang (Ed.). Critical Theory and Transformative Learning. Hershey, PA: Information Science Publishing (2018)
 White Teachers in Diverse Classrooms: Using Narrative to Address Teaching About Racial Dynamics." In, C. Scott & J. Sims (Eds.) Developing Workforce Diversity Programs, Curriculum and Degrees in Higher Education, Hershey, PA: IGI Publishing (2016)

Journal articles 
 * Why White Instructors Should Explore their Racial Identity" Adult Literacy Education: The International Journal of Literacy, Language and Numeracy. Vol. 1, No. 2, 2019.
 * Killing White Innocence: A Review of George Yancy's Backlash: What Happens When We Talk Honestly About Race in America. (Tikkun, 2018)
 Brookfield, S.D.  "Racializing the Discourse of Adult Education."  International Journal of Adult Vocational Education and Training, Vol. 5, No. 4, 2014.
  Teaching Our Own Racism: Incorporating Personal Narratives of Whiteness into Anti-Racist Practice," Adult Learning, 25/3, 2014

See also 
 Reflective practice: Brookfield 1998

References

External links
 stephenbrookfield.com
 American Association for Adult and Continuing Education (AAACE) Stephen Brookfield, Ph.D. Distinguished University Professor, University of St. Thomas

1949 births
Academics from Liverpool
Adult education leaders
Alumni of the University of Leicester
Columbia University faculty
Harvard University staff
Living people
University of St. Thomas (Minnesota) faculty